The 2010–11 NBL season was the 30th season for the Perth Wildcats in the NBL.

Roster

Regular season

Standings

Game log

|- style="background-color:#bbffbb;"
| 1
| 24 August
| Lakeside Lightning
| W 100-95
|  
| 
| 
| Waroona Recreation Centre
| 1–0
|- style="background-color:#bbffbb;"
| 2
| 26 August
| Lakeside Lightning
| W 81-72
|  
| 
| 
| Lakeside Recreation Centre
| 2–0
|- style="background-color:#bbffbb;"
| 3
| 28 August
| Lakeside Lightning
| W 74-73
| 
|
|
| Joondalup Basketball Stadium
| 3-0

|- style="background-color:#ffcccc;"
| 1
| 17 October
| @ Adelaide
| L 69-74
|  
| 
| 
| Adelaide Arena  5,021
| 0-1
|- style="background-color:#ffcccc;"
| 2
| 20 October
| @ New Zealand
| L 94-96
| 
|
|
| North Shore Events Centre  2,280
| 0-2
|- style="background-color:#bbffbb;"
| 3
| 24 October
| @ Melbourne
| W 91-66
| 
| 
| 
| State Netball and Hockey Centre  2,873
| 1-2
|- style="background-color:#bbffbb;"
| 4
| 29 October
| Wollongong
| W 87-84
| 
|
|
| Challenge Stadium  4,200
| 2-2

|- style="background-color:#bbffbb;"
| 5
| 5 November
| @ Townsville
| W 91-85
| 
|
|
| Townsville Entertainment Centre  3,364
| 3-2
|- style="background-color:#ffcccc;"
| 6
| 6 November
| @ Cairns
| L 69-86
| 
|
|
| Cairns Convention Centre  4,070
| 3-3
|- style="background-color:#bbffbb;"
| 7
| 14 November
|  New Zealand
| W 114-74
|
| 
| 
| Challenge Stadium  4,200
| 4-3
|- style="background-color:#bbffbb;"
| 8
| 19 November
| @ Melbourne
| W 93-84
| 
| 
| 
| State Netball and Hockey Centre  3,000
| 5-3
|- style="background-color:#ffcccc;"
| 9
| 28 November
| Cairns
| L 64-72
|
|
|
| Challenge Stadium  4,000
| 5-4

|- style="background-color:#bbffbb;"
| 10
| 5 December
| Townsville
| W 90-64
| 
|
|
| Challenge Stadium  4,000
| 6-4
|- style="background-color:#bbffbb;"
| 11
| 12 December
| Melbourne
| W 87-76 
| Shawn Redhage (22) 
| Shawn Redhage (8)
| Cameron Tovey (5)
| Challenge Stadium  
| 7-4
|- style="background-color:#bbffbb;"
| 12
| 19 December
| Sydney
| W 87-84
| Shawn Redhage (27) 
| Shawn Redhage (10)
| Cameron Tovey (4)
| Challenge Stadium  
| 8-4
|- style="background-color:#bbffbb;"
| 13
| 29 December
| @ Sydney
| W 91-87
| Shawn Redhage (20) 
| Steven Weigh (7)
| Brad Robbins (5)
| Sydney Entertainment Centre  
| 9-4
|- style="background-color:#bbffbb;"
| 14
| 31 December
| @ Gold Coast
| W 96-93
| Steven Weigh,  Cameron Tovey (17) 
| Steven Weigh,  Cameron Tovey,  Kevin Lisch (6)
| Kevin Lisch (6)
| Gold Coast Convention Centre 
| 10-4

|- style="background-color:#ffcccc;"
| 15
| 7 January
| Melbourne
| L 86-93
| Steven Weigh (17)
| Shawn Redhage (10) 
| Cameron Tovey,  Damian Martin (5)
| Challenge Stadium  
| 10-5
|- style="background-color:#bbffbb;"
| 16
| 14 January
| Wollongong
| W 92-58
| Cameron Tovey (16)
| Cameron Tovey (11)
| Cameron Tovey (4)
| Challenge Stadium  ?
| 11-5
|- style="background-color:#bbffbb;"
| 17
| 21 January
| Townsville
| W 88-68
| Shawn Redhage (19)
| Andre Brown (8)
| Brad Robbins (7)
| Challenge Stadium  ?
| 12-5
|- style="background-color:#ffcccc;"
| 18
| 23 January
| @ Adelaide
| L 76-77
| Steven Weigh (17)
| Steven Weigh (9)
| Cameron Tovey (4)
| Adelaide Arena  ?
| 12-6
|- style="background-color:#ffcccc;"
| 19
| 29 January
| Adelaide
| L 65-66
| Steven Weigh (19)
| Cameron Tovey (12)
| Brad Robbins (4)
| Challenge Stadium  ?
| 12-7

|- style="background-color:#ffcccc;"
| 20
| 6 February
| Gold Coast
| L 75-78
| Kevin Lisch (17)
| Steven Weigh (9)
| Damian Martin (4)
| Challenge Stadium  ?
| 12-8
|- style="background-color:#bbffbb;"
| 21
| 11 February
| @ Sydney
| W 98-84
| Kevin Lisch (18)
| Andre Brown (7)
| Steven Weigh (4)
| The Kingdome  ?
| 13-8

See also
 2010–11 NBL season

References

External links
Official Site of the Wildcats

Perth
Perth Wildcats seasons